The traditional star name Marfak may refer to:

α Persei
the pair θ Cassiopeiae and μ Cassiopeiae
The name is derived from an Arabic word مرفق marfaq, meaning "elbow".

Lists of stars